Kulla may refer to:

Kulla (god), god of builders in the Mesopotamian mythology. He is responsible for the creation of bricks and restoration of temples. 
Kulla (goddess), an alternate name of Ukulla, a goddess regarded as the wife of the Mesopotamian god Tishpak.
Kulla, Estonia, village in Halliste Parish, Viljandi County, Estonia
Kulla, Republic of Dagestan, a rural locality in Dagestan, Russia
Kulla, Gurdaspur, Indian village in the Batala sub-district of Punjab
Kulla, Amritsar, Indian village in the Patti sub-district of Punjab
Kulla, Madhya Pradesh, Indian village in the Banda sub-district of Sagar district
Kulla Habibpur, Indian village in the Etah sub-district of Uttar Pradesh
a sub-caste of the Mangrio tribe of Sindh and Rajasthan 
Tower houses in the Balkans, tower houses built in the Balkans
Pellumb Kulla (born 1940), Albanian diplomat and author